The State Titanium Research and Design Institute is an institute that designs non-ferrous metallurgy works and produces materials used in the manufacture of semiconductors and carbon-graphite materials within Ukraine. Institute placed in Zaporizhzhia.

Around 500 people work at the Institute.

References

External links 
 Institute's website
 Ukraine today. State Titanium Research and Design Institute
  О проблемах Института титана г. Запорожье

Titanium
Research institutes in Zaporizhzhia
Research institutes in the Soviet Union
1956 establishments in the Soviet Union
Research institutes established in 1956